Clifford Douglas Blankenship (April 10, 1880 – April 26, 1956) was an American professional baseball player. He played his first game on April 17, 1905. He played his 95th and final game on August 18, 1909. His batting average was .225.

In 1907, Senators manager Joe Cantillon sent Blankenship to Weiser, Idaho, to scout pitcher Walter Johnson. Blankenship successfully persuaded Johnson to accept a Washington contract.

External links

1880 births
1956 deaths
Cincinnati Reds players
Washington Senators (1901–1960) players
Baseball players from Columbus, Georgia
Minor league baseball managers
Terre Haute Hottentots players
Atlanta Firemen players
Toledo Mud Hens players
Seattle Siwashes players
Fresno Tigers players
Tacoma Tigers players
Salt Lake City Skyscrapers players
Missoula (minor league baseball) players
Salt Lake City Bees players
Spokane Indians managers
Murray Infants players